Redemption is an essential concept in many religions, including Judaism, Christianity and Islam. The term implies that something has been paid for or bought back, like a slave who has been set free through the payment of a ransom.

Christianity

In Christian theology, redemption refers to the deliverance of Christians from sin and its consequences. Christians believe that all people are born into a state of sin and separation from God, and that redemption is a necessary part of salvation in order to obtain eternal life. Leon Morris says that "Paul uses the concept of redemption primarily to speak of the saving significance of the death of Christ." 

In the New Testament, redemption and related words are used to refer both to deliverance from sin and to freedom from captivity. In Christian theology, redemption is a metaphor for what is achieved through the atonement; therefore, there is a metaphorical sense in which the death of Jesus pays the price of a ransom, releasing Christians from bondage to sin and death. Most evangelical Protestant theologians and denominations reject Origen's argument that God paid the ransom price of redemption to Satan.

The term salvation refers to the overall process of being saved, which includes redemption especially but also encompasses other aspects of the Christian faith such as sanctification and glorification.

Hinduism
A concept similar to redemption in Indian religions is called prāyaścitta, which is not related to the theological sense of sin, but to expiation and personal liberation from guilt or sin. However the end goal of a being is moksha or liberation from karma, resulting in the end of the cycle of birth and death. By attaining moksha, the Atma (self or soul) merges back into Paramatma (God), just as a wave merges back into the ocean.

Jainism

Like other Indian religions, redemption is more closely related to expiation, but also expects absolution. Pratikramana (lit. "introspection"), is a ritual during which Jains repent (prayaschit) for their sins and non-meritorious activities committed knowingly or inadvertently during their daily life through thought, speech or action. Rather than a Prayascitta after perpetrating sin, it is more of a regular conduct, where every possible form of misdeed is recited and repented, if might have been committed, consciously or accidentally. This is also in form of ātma-ālocana ("self-criticism") which is central to Jainism.  Vratis and Pratimadharis, including Munis and Aryikas perform Sāmāyika and Pratikramana as a daily essential routine.

Islam
In Islam, redemption is achieved by being a Muslim and doing no action that would forfeit one's identification with Islam, being of sincere faith (iman) and doing virtuous actions. Muslim sinners need to turn to a merciful God in repentance and carry out other good deeds, such as prayer (salah) and charity, for redemption. In certain instances, redemption is also linked to seeking forgiveness from the person that has been wronged by Muslims, and obtaining their forgiveness in addition to seeking forgiveness from God directly. As a result of this view of redemption, Muslims have criticized alternative views on redemption, especially the Christian doctrine of original sin.

Judaism

In the Torah, redemption (Hebrew ge'ulah) referred to the ransom of slaves (Exodus 21:8).

The concept of redemption is a legal and transactional one in halakha, including various sacrifices at the Temple in Jerusalem:
 Blood
 Mating
 Sales and borrowing
 Some specific items like the Red Heifer

The concept also applies to redemption of real property such as fields and houses, stock animals, such as donkeys, produce, and specific items such as tefillin. It also means the liberation of an estate in real property from a mortgage.

Redemption also applies to individuals or groups: an Israelite slave, an Israelite captive, and the firstborn son pidyon haben, or redemption of the first-born son,<ref>Eugene Joseph Cohen Guide to ritual circumcision and redemption of the first-born son Volume 1 - 1984 "The Redemption of the First-Born - A mother's first-born is to be dedicated to the service of God, in accordance with the verse, "Sanctify the first-born who opens the womb."1 This sanctification was the result of a historical event."; Michele Klein A Time to Be Born: Customs and Folklore of Jewish Birth 2000 Page 224 "They have attributed healing properties to the stick.54 REDEMPTION OF THE FIRST-BORN SON A first child has special significance for both parents, and this was as true in biblical times as today, but then only when the child was male"; Mark Washofsky Jewish living: a guide to contemporary reform practice 2001 Page 148 "Redemption of the First-born Son (Pidyon Haben)- In Jewish tradition, the first-born son is to be "redeemed" from God. This originates in the belief that God "acquired" the Israelite first-born by sparing them from makkat bekhorot"; Ruth Langer To Worship To Worship God Properly: Tensions Between Liturgical Custom and Halakhah in Judaism (Monographs of the Hebrew Union College Series) 2005 Page 73 "Redemption of the First Born."</ref> is a mitzvah in Judaism whereby a Jewish firstborn son is redeemed from God by use of silver coins to a kohen. It is from these three cases that the concept of exilic redemption is derived because the People Israel are considered God's 'firstborn' derived from Jacob, who are God's slaves forever, but are currently held captive, even while they reside in the modern state of Israel.

In Rabbinic Judaism, redemption refers to God redeeming the Israelites from their exiles, starting with that from Egypt. This includes the final redemption from the present exile.

In Hasidic philosophy parallels are drawn between the redemption from exile and the personal redemption achieved when a person refines his character traits, although there is no source for this in the Talmud. Rather the Messianic redemption is linked to observing Shabbat, Jewish prayer, and the promise of redemption for those looking toward Mount Zion, the last being the original cultural source of 'Zionism'. As such, the original intent of Zionism was the redemption process by which the Land of Israel that has been pledged to the Israelites is reclaimed, accomplished through a payment of the debt owed to God as a fulfillment of the conditions set out in the Torah.

See also

 Baptism
 Easter
 Good Friday
 Penitence
 Salvation
 Redemptive suffering

References

External links
 Redemption, BBC Radio 4 discussion with Richard Harries, Janet Soskice and Stephen Mulhall (In Our Time'', Mar. 13, 2003)

Salvation
Religious terminology